Lamproplax picea is a species of true bug belonging to the family Rhyparochromidae.

It is native to Northern Europe.

References

Rhyparochromidae